Cutie Honey Universe is a 2018 anime television series directed by Akitoshi Yokoyama at Production Reed (now Ashi Productions). It is the fifth animated project based on Go Nagai's Cutie Honey manga franchise, celebrating the author's 50th anniversary as a manga artist. The series began airing in Japan in April 2018 and is licensed in North America by Sentai Filmworks.

Plot
Honey Kisaragi is an android fitted with the Airborne Element Fixing Device, which allows her to transform into the warrior of love, Cutie Honey, among other forms. When her father is killed by the evil Panther Claw organisation, Honey teams up with the PCIS (Panther Claw Criminal Investigative Services) to fight against them, unaware that its key investigator, Inspector Genet, is really Panther Claw's leader, Sister Jill.

Characters
 

Like in the original manga, Honey is a superpowered android living as a young boarding school girl at  the all-girls Saint Chapel Academy. Her powers come from an Airborne Element Fixing Device invented by her father, and it is this invention along with her innocence and good heart that makes her Sister Jill's target.Next to her standard Cutie Honey incarnation, this version sports the following alter egos: the motor-racing Hurricane Honey, the fashion-oriented Fancy Honey, the tomboyish and camera-oriented Flash Honey, the music-oriented Misty Honey, and the cabin attendant-styled Idol Honey.

The leader of Panther Claw, who lusts for the Fixing Device hidden inside Honey's body and for her innocence, which she attempts to destroy, thereby corrupting Honey to evil. Her henchwomen are recruited from among young girls enarmored with her, whom Jill eventually transforms into her superpowered agents of evil. She uses white roses to inject them with a nanovirus, which turn blood-red when the transformation is completed.

Honey's schoolmate and best friend. Initially only knowing about Honey's work for PCIS, she still suspected that Honey was not a normal person, but remains loyal to her. Unlike her manga version, she survives the Panther Claw assault on Saint Chapel in episode 6, and is subsequently entrusted by Honey with her full story. However, shortly afterwards she is captured by Jill and killed by Evil Tarantula Panther just before Honey can rescue her.

Sister Jill's aide de camp. She features several arachnoid characteristics, concluding an additional abdomen and the ability to create weblines which perform a number of functions, including changing the appearance of any person (including herself) enveloped by them. Originally one of the girls fervently devoted to Jill, she gradually becomes disillusioned as she continues witnessing her mistress' cruelty even towards her own devotees and Natsuko's deep love for Honey. When she senses her growing doubts, Jill splits Tarantula into a good and evil half. Good Tarantula atones for her role in Natsuko's death by aiding Honey in her final battle, in which she and her evil half slay each other.

One of Sister Jill's strongest fighters, she has the ability to form her legs and lower body into a dragon, complete with fire-breathing and flight abilities. Unlike most of her peers, she is more interested in a warrior's prowess rather than trying to win Jill's heart, and she is quite fond of Tarantula Panther. For these reasons, she sides with Honey against her former mistress during the final episodes arc, a choice for which she is killed by Sister Jill. This characterization is a complete reversal from her original manga version, where it was Dragon Panther who killed Natsuko and was subsequently slain by Jill for insubordination; a role which is filled by Snake Panther in the Universe series.

In this series, Seiji is a member of PCIS, and an old acquaintance of Dr. Kisaragi. Whenever a case gets too difficult to handle for normal officers, he calls Honey to the scene.

Danbei is the father of Seiji and Junpei and a millionaire, slightly perverted but with a strong sense of justice.

Seiji's younger brother and his father's constant sidekick who shares his pervertedness and has an attraction to older women, including Honey and Genet.

One of Seiji Hayami's assistants in the PCIS, and a former private investigator.
 and 

A pair of young and cheeky female mecha users and intelligence operatives in the PCIS. While effective, they tend to disrespect their superiors and make fun at their incompetence at every opportunity.

The hulking, intimidating boss ("bancho") of a girl gang named the Sukeban at Saint Chapel Academy who act as an inofficial campus police force. Despite her rough looks and personality, she has a crush on Honey and is as a result quite jealous of Natsuko. During Panther Claw's assault on Saint Chapel, in revenge for the death of her entire gang and in order to protect Honey, she intercepts a deadly attack by Snake Panther and covers Honey and Natsuko's escape, apparently at the cost of her own life. However, thanks to her toughness she returns in the final episode to take the final fight to Sister Jill, and later joins Honey at their rebuilt school.
Principal Pochi's Wife

The wife of Saint Chapel's principal who is in a lesbian relationship with Alphonne. She is slain in her lover's arms when Panther Claw destroys Saint Chapel.

Honey and Natsuko's homeroom teacher who is in a lesbian relationship with the principal's wife. She is slain in her lover's arms when Panther Claw destroys Saint Chapel.

The sadistic superintendent of Saint Chapel whose cruel discipline, penchant for sadomasochism and habitual wielding of a whip have earned her the nickname "Histler". Unaware of Honey's alter ego as a super heroine, she often ends up punishing Natsuko whenever Honey is called away on a mission against Panther Claw. Like most of the others, she is killed during Panther Claw's assault on Saint Chapel.

Honey's surrogate father, a scientist who copied the personality patterns of his dying daughter into her android form, into which he also integrated his invention, the Airborne Element Fixing Device. He was later killed by Panther Claw, who were after the device, shielding Honey from a fatal blow; it was also on that night that he taught Honey the secret of her powers. He was also the inventor of a gravity-based transportation device which is frequently used by Panther Claw for their attacks and escapes.

Production
Cutie Honey Universe was first announced in December 2017 as part of creator Go Nagai's 50th anniversary as a manga artist. The anime is being directed by Akitoshi Yokoyama at Production Reed, with series composition by Natsuko Takahashi and character design and chief animation direction by Syuichi Iseki. The series premiered in Japan on April 8, 2018 on AT-X, Tokyo MX and BS11. Sentai Filmworks licensed the series and is simulcasting it in several countries outside of Japan on their Hidive service; they are scheduled to also publish a home video release of the series.

Episode list

Notes

References

External links
  
 Official English website
 
 

2018 anime television series debuts
Adventure anime and manga
Ashi Productions
Universe
LGBT in anime and manga
Magical girl anime and manga
Science fiction anime and manga
Sentai Filmworks

ja:キューティーハニー#テレビアニメ「Cutie Honey Universe」